Donald A. Gillies (born 1944) is a British philosopher and historian of science and mathematics. He is an Emeritus Professor in the Department of Science and Technology Studies at University College London.

Career

After undergraduate studies in mathematics and philosophy at Cambridge, Gillies became a graduate student of Karl Popper and Imre Lakatos (his  official PhD supervisor) at the London School of Economics, where he completed a PhD on the foundations of probability.

Gilles is a past President and a current Vice-President of British Society for the Philosophy of Science. From 1982 to 1985 he was an editor of the British Journal for the Philosophy of Science.

Gillies is probably best known for his work on Bayesian confirmation theory, his attempt to simplify and extend Popper’s theory of corroboration.  He proposes a novel "principle of explanatory surplus", likening a successful theoretician to a successful entrepreneur.  The entrepreneur generates a surplus (of income) over and above his initial investment (the outgoes) to meet the necessary expenses of the enterprise.  Similarly, the theoretician generates a surplus (of explanations) over and above his initial investment (of assumptions) to make the necessary explanations of known facts.  The size of this surplus is held to be a measure of the confirmation of the theory, but only in qualitative, rather than quantitative, terms.

Gillies has researched the philosophy of science, most particularly the foundations of probability; the philosophy of logic and mathematics; and the interactions of artificial intelligence with some aspects of philosophy, including probability, logic, causality and scientific method. In the philosophy of mathematics, he has developed a method of dealing with very large transfinite cardinals from an Aristotelian point of view.

Books and articles (selection)
Gillies, Donald and Chihara, Charles S. (1988). "An Interchange on the Popper-Miller Argument". Philosophical Studies, Volume 54, pp. 1–8.
Gillies, Donald (1989). "Non-Bayesian Confirmation Theory and the Principle of Explanatory Surplus". The Philosophy of Science Association, PSA 1988, Volume 2, pp. 373–380.
Gillies, Donald ed. (1992). Revolutions in Mathematics. Oxford Science Publications. The Clarendon Press, Oxford University Press, New York.
Gillies, Donald (1996). "Artificial intelligence and scientific method". Oxford: Oxford University Press.
Gillies, Donald (2000). Philosophical Theories of Probability. London: Routledge.
Gillies, Donald (2010). An objective Theory of Probability. London: Routledge.
Gillies, Donald (2011). Frege, Dedekind, and Peano on the Foundations of Arithmetic. London: Routledge.

References

External links
Donald Gillies's personal webpage, University College London

Philosophers of mathematics
Philosophers of science
British historians of mathematics
20th-century English mathematicians
21st-century English mathematicians
Academics of University College London
Living people
20th-century British philosophers
21st-century British philosophers
1944 births